The 1986 Los Angeles Raiders season was their 27th in the league. They were unable to improve upon the previous season's output of 12–4, winning only eight games. The team failed to qualify for the playoffs for the first time in five seasons. This would also be Ray Guy's final season of his Hall of Fame career with the Raiders.

The 1986 season was marked by highly competitive games (only four of the Raiders' sixteen regular season games were decided by more than a touchdown). The campaign also marked the end of storied quarterback Jim Plunkett's career. After starting the season 0-3, the Raiders proceeded to win eight of their next nine games before losing their final four games to miss the playoffs.

Offseason

NFL Draft

Personnel

Staff

Roster

Schedule

Season summary

Week 1

Week 2

Week 3

Week 4

Week 5 at Chiefs

Week 6

Week 7

Week 8

Week 9

Week 10

    
    
    
    
    
    

 Dokie Williams 5 Rec, 107 Yds

Standings

References

Los Angeles Raiders seasons
Los Angeles Raiders
Los